Ole Sverre (7 June 1865 – 31 January 1952) was a Norwegian architect. His work was part of the architecture event in the art competition at the 1928 Summer Olympics.

References

1865 births
1952 deaths
19th-century Norwegian architects
20th-century Norwegian architects
Olympic competitors in art competitions
People from Fredrikstad